Christopher Boucher (born January 11, 1993) is a Canadian-Saint Lucian professional basketball player who plays for the Toronto Raptors of the National Basketball Association (NBA). Born in Saint Lucia, he played college basketball for the Oregon Ducks.

Early life
Boucher was born in Castries, Saint Lucia. He moved with his mother, Mary McVane, to Montreal when he was five years old to see his Canadian father Jean-Guy Boucher. However, his parents split up when he was young and Boucher had a poor relationship with his father. He grew up playing soccer and ice hockey but lived in poverty in the Montréal-Nord neighbourhood. He dropped out of high school at age 16 and worked as a cook and dishwasher in a St-Hubert restaurant. In 2012, he was offered a spot on a tournament basketball team, and scored 44 points in the tournament final. Boucher, who previously only played pickup basketball, was offered a spot on Amateur Athletic Union AAU team Alma Academy by coaches Igor Rwigema and Ibrahim Appiah. He accepted a spot at the Academy, which was created to help inner-city teenagers with few future prospects, to earn a high school diploma. In a game versus New Jersey's Blair Academy, Boucher scored 29 points and 12 rebounds, attracting the interest of Division I college coaches.

College career
Boucher played one season at New Mexico Junior College, averaging 11.9 points and 6.7 rebounds per game. Then, he went to Northwest College in Powell, Wyoming, where he was named NJCAA Player of the Year after leading the team to a 31–5 record. That season, he shot 62.7% from inside the arc and 44.4% from three-point range, averaging 22.5 points, 11.8 rebounds, and 4.7 blocks per game. His 11.8 rebounds per game were fifth-best in junior college that season, while his 4.7 blocks per game were good for third-best. Following a campus visit, Boucher transferred to Oregon, which he chose over TCU, Minnesota and Texas Tech.

At the beginning of his first year at the University of Oregon, he worried Ducks coach Dana Altman due to his thin physique but made up for it with his energy. In his second game in a Ducks uniform on November 16, 2015, Boucher was competing against Baylor's Rico Gathers, and Boucher scored 15 points and gathered eight rebounds. He set a single season blocks record for Oregon with 110. Boucher recorded 14 points, 10 rebounds and two steals in the Ducks' 80–68 loss to Oklahoma in the Elite Eight of the NCAA Tournament. Following the 2015–16 season he was granted a hardship waiver to play an extra season and complete his sociology degree. He averaged 12.0 points and 6.8 rebounds in his two-year career for the Ducks. As a senior, he was named to the Pac-12 Defensive Team after leading the conference in blocks with 2.6 per game. Boucher scored 23 points and a career-high 19 rebounds against Montana in December 2016. In the Pac-12 Tournament semifinals against California on March 11, 2017, an opposing player fell on Boucher's leg awkwardly, but he continued to play and finished the game with 10 points and four rebounds. The following day, an MRI scan revealed a torn ACL and he was ruled out for the remainder of the season.

Professional career

Golden State Warriors (2017–2018)
Prior to the 2017 NBA draft, Boucher was unable to work out with teams due to his injury. He ultimately went undrafted, but was signed by the Golden State Warriors to a two-way contract, the same team which purchased a draft pick from the Chicago Bulls to choose his Oregon teammate Jordan Bell. Boucher became one of the first players to sign up on the NBA's newest two-way contract policy, which went into effect that season, although his deal was not official until July 14, 2017. On November 2, 2017, Boucher was called up to the NBA G League by the Santa Cruz Warriors and made his debut versus the Reno Bighorns. On March 14, 2018, Boucher made his NBA debut, being called up by the Golden State Warriors to fill in for the injury-riddled lineup. In his first and only minute of action with Golden State, he recorded 1 rebound and 1 three-point attempt in a 117-106 victory over the Los Angeles Lakers. Although he was unavailable to play in the playoffs due to his two-way contract, Boucher was a part of the Warriors championship team after they swept the Cleveland Cavaliers in four games in the 2018 NBA Finals. On June 22, 2018, the Golden State Warriors waived Boucher.

Toronto Raptors (2018–present)
On July 20, 2018, Boucher signed with the Toronto Raptors as a free agent for two years worth just over $2 million. On October 26, 2018, the Raptors converted Boucher's contract to an NBA two-way contract. Boucher played 28 games with the Raptors' NBA G League affiliate, the Raptors 905 where he averaged 27.2 points, 11.4 rebounds, & 4.1 blocks, while also shooting 51.0% from the field. Boucher would go on to be named the G League 2018–19 Most Valuable Player and the league's Defensive Player of the Year, becoming the first player to win both awards concurrently, & the first international player to win the league MVP award. Additionally, Boucher was also named to the All-NBA G League First Team. On February 10, 2019, the Raptors signed Boucher to a standard NBA contract. The Raptors made it to the 2019 NBA Finals where they defeated Boucher's former team, the Golden State Warriors. In doing so, Boucher became the first (and so far only) Canadian player to win an NBA title with the NBA's lone Canadian based franchise.

On November 10, 2019, Boucher tied his career high in points by scoring 15 points in a Raptors win over LeBron James and the Lakers. On December 22, 2019, Boucher scored 21 points, and set a new career high in the Raptors 110–107 win over the Dallas Mavericks. Three days later, on December 25, 2019, Boucher set a new career-high again with 24 points in a 118–102 loss to the Boston Celtics. On March 3, 2020, he set a career-high in rebounds with 15 in a win against the Phoenix Suns. On August 10, 2020 in the Orlando bubble, Boucher scored a career-high 25 points against the Milwaukee Bucks. 

On November 25, 2020, Boucher re-signed with the Raptors for two years worth $13.5 million. On December 26, 2020, Boucher had 22 points, 10 rebounds, and a career-high seven blocks against the San Antonio Spurs. On January 14, 2021, Boucher tied a career-high 25 points against the Charlotte Hornets. On February 6, 2021, Boucher hit another scoring high with 29 points, 10 rebounds and 2 blocks in a loss to the Atlanta Hawks. On March 4, 2021, Boucher had a then season-high 30 points and five rebounds in a 132–125 loss to the Boston Celtics. Then, on April 8, 2021, Boucher hit another scoring high with 38 points, a career-high 19 rebounds and one assist in a 122–113 loss against the Bulls. On April 18, 2021, Boucher scored 31 points with 12 rebounds, two assists, one steal and one block and hit a career-high six threes in a 112–106 win against the Oklahoma City Thunder.

On June 30, 2022, Boucher re-signed with the Raptors on a three-year, $35.25M deal.

Career statistics

NBA

Regular season

|-
| style="text-align:left;background:#afe6ba;"|†
| style="text-align:left;"| Golden State
| 1 || 0 || 1.0 || .000 || .000 || .000 || 1.0 || .0 || .0 || .0 || .0
|-
| style="text-align:left;background:#afe6ba;"|†
| style="text-align:left;"|Toronto
| 28 || 0 || 5.8 || .447 || .324 || .867 || 2.0 || .1 || .2 || .9 || 3.3
|-
| style="text-align:left;"|
| style="text-align:left;"|Toronto
| 62 || 0 || 13.2 || .472 || .322 || .784 || 4.5 || .4 || .4 || 1.0 || 6.6
|-
| style="text-align:left;"|
| style="text-align:left;"|Toronto
| 60 || 14 || 24.2 || .514 || .383 || .788 || 6.7 || 1.1 || .6 || 1.9 || 13.6
|-
| style="text-align:left;"|
| style="text-align:left;"|Toronto
| 80 || 9 || 21.1 || .464 || .297 || .777 || 6.2 || .3 || .6 || .9 || 9.4
|- class="sortbottom"
| style="text-align:center;" colspan="2"| Career
| 231 || 23 || 17.9 || .483 || .335 || .785 || 5.3 || .5 || .5 || 1.2 || 9.0

Playoffs

|-
| style="text-align:left; background:#afe6ba;"|2019†
| style="text-align:left;"|Toronto
| 2 || 0 || 2.0 || .400 || .333 || .000 || .5 || .0 || .0 || .5 || 2.5
|-
| style="text-align:left;"|2020
| style="text-align:left;"|Toronto
| 7 || 0 || 6.1 || .273 || .400 || .000 || 1.7 || .1 || .0 || .3 || 1.1
|-
| style="text-align:left;"|2022
| style="text-align:left;"|Toronto
| 6 || 0 || 21.7 || .619 || .400 || .900 || 5.8 || .2 || .2 || 1.2 || 11.2
|- class="sortbottom"
| style="text-align:center;" colspan="2"|Career
| 15 || 0 || 11.8 || .534 || .391 || .750 || 3.2 || .1 || .1 || .7 || 5.3

College

|-
| style="text-align:left;"| 2015–16
| style="text-align:left;"| Oregon
| 38 || 35 || 25.8 || .539 || .339 || .685 || 7.4 || .4 || .8 || 2.9 || 12.1
|-
| style="text-align:left;"| 2016–17
| style="text-align:left;"| Oregon
| 31 || 12 || 23.6 || .524 || .350 || .565 || 6.1 || .4 || .4 || 2.5 || 11.8
|- class="sortbottom"
| style="text-align:center;" colspan="2"| Career
| 69 || 47 || 24.8 || .532 || .344 || .641 || 6.8 || .4 || .6 || 2.7 || 12.0

College statistics only available for final two years at Oregon.

References

External links

 Oregon Ducks bio
 Draftexpress.com profile

1993 births
Living people
Black Canadian basketball players
Basketball players from Montreal
Canadian expatriate basketball people in the United States
Canadian men's basketball players
Canadian people of Saint Lucian descent
Centers (basketball)
Golden State Warriors players
NMJC Thunderbirds men's basketball players
Oregon Ducks men's basketball players
People from Castries Quarter
Power forwards (basketball)
Raptors 905 players  
Saint Lucian emigrants to Canada
Saint Lucian men's basketball players
Saint Lucian people of Canadian descent
Santa Cruz Warriors players
Toronto Raptors players
Undrafted National Basketball Association players